No Boundaries is the debut solo studio album by American heavy metal musician Michael Angelo Batio. Recorded at M.A.C.E. Studios in Chicago, Illinois, it was released on September 1, 1995 by his own label M.A.C.E. Music. Batio performed the majority of instruments on the release, as well as producing, engineering and mixing the album.

Background and production
Michael Angelo Batio began his solo career shortly after the break-up of his previous band Nitro, which featured lead vocalist Jim Gillette, in 1992. His debut solo album, No Boundaries, was recorded at M.A.C.E. Studios and mixed at Monsterdisc, both in his hometown Chicago, with Batio handling all production, engineering and mixing; Jason Rau mastered the album. All electric and acoustic guitars, bass, keyboards and percussion programming were performed by Batio, with Rob Ross contributing drums to "Rain Forest", "Science Fiction" and "2X Again".

The album's title track, "No Boundaries", was originally written for one of Batio's instructional guitar videos, not for the album itself, with the guitarist claiming he "didn't even know the song ... would be popular". The video in question was the 1991 Metal Method production Speed Kills; the track was later featured on the video Speed Lives, which breaks down and teaches the song in 27 parts. Additionally, "The Finish Line" was featured on Speed Lives 3.

Reception and legacy
Quoting a review by critic Kevin Prowse, Guitar Nine Records noted that No Boundaries "has been heralded as one of the top ten instrumental guitar CDs of the 90s". Prowse praised the "mastery of various lead [guitar] techniques like speed picking, string skipping, arpeggios and cross string tapping" on display, and selected "Science Fiction", "Rain Forest" and "No Boundaries" as particular highlights on the album.

In 2007, Batio released the album 2 X Again, which features remixed and remastered songs from No Boundaries and follow-up album Planet Gemini with re-recorded drums by Joe Babiak. From No Boundaries, all tracks except "Intro: This CD Is Dedicated to You" and "The Finish Line" were included. The guitarist's 2015 "career-spanning retrospective" compilation album Shred Force 1: The Essential MAB features "2X Again", "Rain Forest", "No Boundaries" and "Peace" (on digital versions only), all of which were originally released on No Boundaries.

Track listing

Personnel
Personnel credits adapted from the album's booklet.

Michael Angelo – electric guitars, acoustic guitars, bass, keyboards, percussion programming, additional drums, arrangements, production, engineering, mixing
Rob Ross – drums ("Rain Forest", "Science Fiction" and "2X Again")
Jason Rau – mastering
Rich Siegle – art direction, design
Gary Mankus – photography

References

1995 debut albums
Michael Angelo Batio albums
M.A.C.E. Music albums